Electoral district I (Croatian: I. izborna jedinica) is one of twelve electoral districts of the Croatian Parliament.

Boundaries 
Electoral district I consists of:

 the northwestern part of Zagreb County including cities and municipalities: Bistra, Brdovec, Dubravica, Jakovlje, Luka, Marija Gorica, Pušča, Zaprešić;
 part of central and western City of Zagreb including city districts and streets: Voćarska, Petrova, Ribnjak, Hrvatskih narodnih vladara, Antona Bauera, Matko Laginja, Pavao Šubić, Kralj Zvonimir, Petar Krešimir IV., Knez Mislav, Eugen Kvaternik, Maksimirska naselja, Ružmarinka, Peščenica, Šestine, Mlinovi, Gračani, Markuševec, Vidovec, Remete, Bukovec, Kozjak, Maksimir, Dobri Dol, Dinko Šimunović, Mašićeva, Dotršćina, Ban Keglević, Petar Zrinski, Stjepan Radić, Kraljevac, Ivan Kukuljević Sakcinski, Tuškanac, Gornji Grad, Nova Ves, August Cesarec, Zrinjevac, Cvjetni trg, Andrija Medulić, Ante Topić Mimara, Petar Svačić, August Šenoa, Gupčeva Zvijezda, Medveščak, Šalata, Samoborček, Podsused, Gornji Stenjevec, Perjavica-Borčec, Gornje Vrapče, Vrapče-centar, Vrapče-jug, Gornja Kustošija, Kustošija-centar, Sveti Duh, Medvedgrad, Šestinski Dol, Jelenovac, Matija Gubec, Rudeš, Ante Starčević, Ljubljanica, Ciglenica, Pongračevo, Nikola Tesla, Stara Trešnjevka, S.S. Kranjčević, Antun Mihanović, Bartol Kašić, Horvati-Srednjaci, Knežija, Trnjanska Savica, Martinovka, Poljane, Miramare, Cvjetnica, Marin Držić, Trnje, Cvjetno naselje, Veslačko naselje, Savski kuti, Staro Trnje, Hrvatskog književnika Mile Budaka, Sigečica.

Election

2000 Elections 
 
 

SDP - HSLS 
 Ivica Račan
 Milan Bandić
 Goran Granić
 Mirjana Ferić-Vac
 Goranko Fižulić
 Mirjana Didović
 Nenad Stazić
 Hrvoje Kraljević
 Ivo Šlaus

HDZ
 Mate Granić
 Zlatko Canjuga
 Marina Matulović-Dropulić

HSS - LS - HNS - ASH
 Vlado Gotovac
 Josip Torbar

2003 Elections 
 

SDP
 Ivica Račan
 Antun Vujić
 Mirko Filipović
 Ivo Josipović
 Vice Vukov
 Jelena Pavičić Vukičević

HDZ
 Jadranka Kosor
 Božo Biškupić
 Marko Turić
 Petar Selem
 Franjo Arapović

HNS
 Vesna Pusić
 Srećko Ferenčak

HSP - ZDS
 Slaven Letica

2007 Elections 
 

SDP
 Zoran Milanović
 Antun Vujić
 Neven Mimica
 Ivo Josipović
 Mirela Holy
 Gvozden Srećko Flego
 Gordan Maras
 Mirjana Ferić-Vac

HDZ
 Jadranka Kosor
 Petar Selem
 Mladen Barišić
 Marko Turić
 Željko Turk

HNS
 Vesna Pusić

2011 Elections 
 

SDP - HNS - IDS - HSU
 Zoran Milanović
 Vesna Pusić
 Davor Bernardić
 Josip Kregar
 Tonino Picula
 Gordana Sobol
 Tomislav Saucha
 Gvozden Srećko Flego
 Igor Rađenović

HDZ
 Gordan Jandroković
 Miroslav Tuđman
 Željko Reiner
 Đurđica Sumrak

HL SR
 Branko Vukšić

2015 Elections 
 

SDP - HNS - HSU - HL SR - A-HSS - ZS
 Zoran Milanović
 Vesna Pusić
 Davor Bernardić
 Igor Dragovan
 Orsat Miljenić
 Siniša Varga
 Joško Klisović

HDZ - HSS - HSP AS - BUZ - HSLS - HRAST - HDS - ZDS
 Željko Reiner
 Davorin Mlakar
 Darinko Kosor
 Margareta Mađerić

Most
 Drago Prgomet
 Gordana Rusak
 Irena Petrijevčanin Vuksanović

2016 Elections 
 

SDP - HNS - HSS - HSU
 Zoran Milanović
 Vesna Pusić
 Davor Bernardić
 Igor Dragovan
 Orsat Miljenić
 Siniša Varga
 Joško Klisović

HDZ - HSLS
 Andrej Plenković
 Bruna Esih
 Gordan Jandroković
 Darinko Kosor
 Željko Reiner

Most
 Vlaho Orepić

ŽZ - PH - AM - Abeceda
 Goran Aleksić

2020 Elections 
 

HDZ - HSLS
 Andrej Plenković
 Željko Reiner
 Nina Obuljen Koržinek
 Zvonko Milas
 Darko Klasić

SDP - HSS - HSU - SNAGA - GLAS - IDS - PGS
 Davor Bernardić
 Anka Mrak-Taritaš
 Nikša Vukas

Možemo - ZJN - NL - RF - ORAH - ZG
 Tomislav Tomašević
 Sandra Benčić
 Damir Bakić

DP - HS - BLOK - HKS - HRAST - SU - ZL
 Zlatko Hasanbegović

Most
 Marija Selak Raspudić

SIP - Pametno - Fokus
 Dalija Orešković

References 

Electoral districts in Croatia